Joe Plouff (born February 8, 1950) is an American Democratic politician from Wisconsin.

Born in De Pere, Wisconsin, Plouff received his bachelor's degree from the University of Wisconsin–Eau Claire and his master's degree from the University of Wisconsin–Stout. Plouff also served in the United States Army. He served on the Menomonie, Wisconsin Common Council and the Dunn County, Wisconsin Board of Supervisors. Plouff served in the Wisconsin State Assembly from 1997 until 2005, when he was defeated for re-election in 2004.

Notes

People from De Pere, Wisconsin
People from Menomonie, Wisconsin
University of Wisconsin–Eau Claire alumni
University of Wisconsin–Stout alumni
Wisconsin city council members
County supervisors in Wisconsin
1950 births
Living people
21st-century American politicians
Democratic Party members of the Wisconsin State Assembly